Lakeshore High School is a public high school located in unincorporated St. Tammany Parish, Louisiana, United States, north of Mandeville. Lakeshore High School receives the students from Monteleone Junior High School. The school is operated by the St. Tammany Parish Public Schools district.

The school serves almost all of Lacombe and a small section of Mandeville. Lakeshore was founded in 2009 and its current enrollment is around 1,072 students, as of Fall 2017. The current mascot for Lakeshore High School is the Titans, and they are rivals of the Fontainebleau Bulldogs and the Mandeville Skippers.

Academics

The school offers many AP courses including Calculus, English III, and Human Geography.

Athletics
Lakeshore High School is a member of District 8-4A in the Louisiana High School Athletic Association.

Championships
Lakeshore High School boys Cross- Country team has won 5 District Championships in the following years; 2016, 2017, 2018, 2019, 2020
Lakeshore High School football have been District Champions for the following years; 2017, 2018, 2019, 2020

The school football team made it to the LHSAA state championship in the 2017 season.
Lakeshore High School girls soccer won the 2016 state championship. They came in second place for the 2019, and 2021 season.
Lakeshore High School boys & girls soccer made it to the state championship in the 2019 season.
Lakeshore High School boys Swim team won state-runner up in the D-II State championship for the 2020 season.
Lakeshore High School boys & girls track team have won the District Meet for the following three years; 2017, 2018, 2019

Notable alumni
Treston Decoud, NFL player, selected 169th in the 2017 draft by the Houston Texans

References

External links

Public high schools in Louisiana
Schools in St. Tammany Parish, Louisiana
Educational institutions established in 2009
2009 establishments in Louisiana